All Tomorrow's Parties is a science fiction novel by American-Canadian writer William Gibson, the third and final book in his Bridge trilogy. Like its predecessors, All Tomorrow's Parties is a speculative fiction novel set in a postmodern, dystopian, postcyberpunk future. The novel borrows its title from a song by Velvet Underground. It is written in the third person and deals with Gibsonian themes of emergent technology. The novel was initially published by Viking Press on October 7, 1999.

Plot summary
The book has three separate but overlapping stories, with the repeated appearance of shared characters. The San Francisco/Oakland Bay Bridge, the overarching setting of the trilogy, functions as a shared location of their convergence and resolution.

The first story features former cop Berry Rydell, the protagonist of Virtual Light. Rydell quits a temporary job as a security guard at the Lucky Dragon convenience store to run errands for atrophied computer hacker Colin Laney (the protagonist of Idoru), who lives in a cardboard box in a subway in Shinjuku, Tokyo. As a child, Laney was the subject of pharmaceutical trials which damaged his nervous system. As a result, he has a form of attention deficit disorder but gains the ability to discern nodal points in the undifferentiated flow of information, and from that he acquires a certain predictive faculty. This makes him ideal for the role of "netrunner" or data analyst. A side effect of 5-SB, the drug administered to Laney, causes the user to become attached to strong personalities. As a result, Laney has become obsessed with media baron Cody Harwood of Harwood/Levine, a powerful public relations firm. He spends his life surfing the net from his enclave in the subway, searching for traces of Harwood in the media. From this, Laney foresees a crucial historical shift which may precede the end of the world "as we know it". He predicts that Harwood, who had also taken 5-SB before (albeit voluntarily, with the knowledge of the consequences), knows this and will try to shape this historical shift to his liking. To stop Harwood, Laney hires Rydell under the guise of a courier to travel to San Francisco where he believes the next nodal point will congeal.

The second story concerns ex-bicycle messenger Chevette Washington, also from Virtual Light, who is on the run from her ex-boyfriend. She escapes to her former home, San Francisco's bridge community, to find refuge and revisit her past. She is accompanied by Tessa, an Australian media sciences student who visits the bridge to film a documentary on "interstitial communities".

The third story follows a mysterious, left-handed mercenary named Konrad, who, although employed by Harwood, appears to be directed by his own motives. In particular, Konrad aligns his movements with the Tao, the spontaneous, universal energy path of Taoist philosophy.

Characters
Characters with point-of-view chapters:
Colin Laney – data analyst with an ability to sense nodal points (previously appeared in Idoru).
Chevette Washington – an ex-bike messenger who lived on the Bridge for several years and is on the run from an abusive boyfriend (Virtual Light).
Berry Rydell – a rent-a-cop and former lover of Chevette who is working as a security guard at a convenience store Lucky Dragon in Los Angeles (Virtual Light, Idoru).
Shinya Yamazaki – self-described "student of existential sociology" (Virtual Light, Idoru).
Konrad – Taoist assassin hired by Harwood.
Silencio – a savant boy with an extreme fascination with watches and the talent to find them, no matter the circumstances.
Fontaine – a Bridge resident and pawn-shop owner who takes Silencio into his care. (Virtual Light)
Boomzilla – a street impresario with designs on Tessa's balloon camera.

Other characters:
Tessa – Chevette's media student roommate, who drives Chevette to the Bridge in her van in order to make a documentary on its inhabitants.
Rei Toei – a holographic idol (the beautiful "emergent system" from Idoru).
Buell Creedmore – an alcoholic/drug addict country singer with a short temper and a knack for being in the wrong place at the right time. Although he tries to pass himself off as a native Southerner, he later reveals he was born and raised in New Jersey.
Maryalice – PR for Buell (Idoru).
Carson – Chevette's abusive ex.
Cody Harwood – head of a PR company, extremely powerful behind-the-scenes player (Virtual Light). 
The Suit – an impoverished ex-salaryman who lives in the Tokyo subway and repaints his suit daily instead of purchasing a fresh one.

Major themes
Major recurring Gibsonian themes which feature heavily in All Tomorrow's Parties are the sociological impact of emergent technology (notably nanotechnology and artificial intelligence), millennial alienation, the commodification of the counterculture, the existence of nodal points in history (most notably the dawn of the nuclear age in 1911), and the notion of the interstitial. Despite the novel's oblique reference to Madame Curie, Gibson has stated that his placement of the last major nodal point in 1911 was a "viewpoint joke," unconnected to factual events in that year. He had heard a story that Virginia Woolf "pinned the beginning of the modern era on a particular weekend in 1911."   (Woolf had actually declared that human nature underwent a fundamental change "on or about December 1910," which inspired the belief that the modernist literary movement began around that time.) The author's long-time fascination with Japanese culture continues in this novel.

Literary significance and reception
The novel was critically well-received, with particular note given to Gibson's vivid, well-realised setting and dense prose, though reviewers found its ending to be anticlimactic. Sci Fi Weekly reviewer Curt Wohleber praised the "precision and economy" of All Tomorrow's Parties in comparison to its sometimes dull predecessors.

Gibson scholar Tatiana Rapatzikou located the novel's significance in the fact that it had several motifs, themes and characters in common with Virtual Light and Idoru "without being sequential".

In the words of The Guardian journalist Steven Poole, the novel completed Gibson's development "from science-fiction hotshot to wry sociologist of the near future".

References

External links 
All Tomorrow's Parties at WilliamGibsonBooks.com
All Tomorrow's Parties at FantasticFiction.co.uk
Chapters 1–4 of All Tomorrow's Parties at nytimes.com

1999 Canadian novels
Bridge trilogy
Cyberpunk novels
Dystopian novels
Novels by William Gibson
1999 science fiction novels
Novels set in San Francisco
Viking Press books